Golden Valley Is Now is an album by the group of the same name, featuring bassist Reid Anderson, drummer Dave King, and keyboardist Craig Taborn. It was recorded in August 2018 in Minneapolis, and was released by Intakt Records in 2019.

The album title refers to the fact that all three musicians grew up in Golden Valley, Minnesota, and have played together on occasion since high school.

Reception

In a review for AllMusic, Thom Jurek called the album "lovely," and wrote: "This date isn't about showing musical muscle; it's about composing, playing, and arranging songs -- simple instrumental ones -- with creativity and panache. This trio accomplish that with rawness, immediacy, collective good will, and a wacky kind of elegance."

Kevin Le Gendre of Jazzwise stated: "With influences spanning the more cultured end of 1990s synth-pop and sophisticated, orchestral electronica... the music carries the kind of sheen and shimmer one would attribute to any artists with a deep interest in both analogue and digital technology. Beyond the rich textural palette created... there is a thread of intense melancholy running through the material."

Writing for Jazz Times, A. D. Amorosi noted the album's "rainbow of surprisingly subtle colors and shadings," and praised the "manic propulsion" of "High Waist Drifter," with its "rapid-fire cymbal attack, party-ball handclapping, and Taborn's cheesy garage-band organ."

In an article for the Los Angeles Review of Books, Dan DiPiero described the recording as "a beguiling album of intricate, nuanced, melancholic pop songs performed by three master improvisers, and featuring almost no identifiable improvisations whatsoever."

Track listings

 "City Diamond" (Anderson) – 5:54
 "Sparklers and Snakes" (King) – 3:57
 "Song One" (Anderson) – 7:42
 "This Is Nothing" (Anderson) – 6:28
 "High Waist Drifter" (King) – 2:47
 "Polar Heroes" (Anderson) – 4:28
 "You Might Live Here" (Anderson) – 5:37
 "Solar Barges" (King) – 5:09
 "Hwy 1000" (Anderson) – 4:14
 "The End of the World" (Anderson) – 2:07

Personnel 
 Craig Taborn – synthesizers, electric piano, acoustic piano
 Reid Anderson – electric bass, electronics
 Dave King – drums, electronic drums

References

2019 albums
Craig Taborn albums
Intakt Records albums